Virudhunagar is a legislative assembly constituency in the Indian state of Tamil Nadu. Elections were not held in year 1957 and 1962. Former Chief Minister of Tamil Nadu K. Kamaraj lost to P. Seenivasan in 1967 from Virudhunagar. It is a part of the Virudhunagar Lok Sabha constituency. It is one of the 234 State Legislative Assembly Constituencies in Tamil Nadu, in India.

Madras State assembly

Tamil Nadu assembly

Election Results

2021

2016

2011

2006

2001

1996

1991

1989

1984

1980

1977

1971

1967

1952

References 

 

Assembly constituencies of Tamil Nadu
Virudhunagar district